The 2009 Camping World Indy Grand Prix at the Glen was the ninth round of the 2009 IndyCar Series season.  It took place on July 5, 2009, at the  Watkins Glen International road course in Watkins Glen, New York.

Race

Standings after the race 

Drivers' Championship standings

 Note: Only the top five positions are included for the standings.

References

Camping World Indy Grand Prix at the Glen
Watkins Glen Indy Grand Prix
Camping World
Camping World Indy Grand Prix at the Glen